Frances Marie Tydingco-Gatewood (born January 21, 1958) is an American attorney and jurist serving as the Chief United States district judge of the federal District Court of Guam.

Early life and education 
Tydingco-Gatewood was born on January 21, 1958, in Honolulu, Territory of Hawaii. She attended George Washington High School, in Mangilao, Guam and obtained her Bachelor of Arts in political science at Marquette University in 1980. She received her Juris Doctor from the University of Missouri–Kansas City School of Law in 1983.

Legal career 
She began her legal career as a law clerk for Forest W. Hanna on the circuit court of Jackson County, Missouri from 1983 to 1984. In 1984, she became the first female Chamoru assistant Attorney General of Guam. She served as assistant attorney general in that office until 1988. She then worked with the Jackson County Prosecutor’s Office in Missouri  as an assistant prosecutor from 1988 to 1990. While in the Missouri office,
She was assigned to the Drug Team and Homicide Unit and served as the Trial Team Leader for the Sex Crimes Unit. Subsequently, she served as chief prosecutor for the District of Guam from 1990 to 1994 at the Office of the Attorney General.

Judicial career

Superior Court of Guam 
In 1994, she was appointed by Governor Joseph F. Ada as a trial judge of the Superior Court of Guam.

Supreme Court of Guam 

On September 1, 2001, she was appointed by Governor Carl Gutierrez as an associate justice of the Supreme Court of Guam. She was sworn in on February 8, 2002 and served in that position until October 29, 2006.

United States District and Bankruptcy Courts of Guam 
Tydingco-Gatewood was nominated as a United States District Judge of the District Court of Guam by President George W. Bush on April 25, 2006. She was confirmed by the United States Senate on August 3, 2006.  Chief Judge Tydingco-Gatewood is only 1 of 2 judges in the entire federal judiciary who sits as both a district and bankruptcy judge. 
 She was renominated on May 18, 2016, by President Barack Obama to another ten-year term on the court.  On January 3, 2017, her nomination was returned to the president at the sine die adjournment of the 114th Congress. She is currently sitting as a “holdover” judge and awaiting potential reappointment at this time.

References 

1958 births
Living people
21st-century American judges
21st-century American women judges
American prosecutors
American women lawyers
Chamorro people
Guamanian judges
Guamanian lawyers
Marquette University alumni
Missouri lawyers
People from Honolulu
United States district court judges appointed by George W. Bush
University of Missouri School of Law alumni